Richard Michael Charles Gilliat (born 20 May 1944 Ware, Hertfordshire) is a retired English first-class cricketer.

Gilliat was educated at Charterhouse and Christ Church, Oxford. He represented Oxford University and Hampshire as a left-handed batsman and very occasional leg-break bowler in 269 first-class matches (1964–1978) and 165 List A matches (1968–1978).

His most successful season with the bat was 1969, when he scored the fastest century of the County Championship season (against Essex at Ilford), his highest score (223 not out against Warwickshire at Southampton), and finished with 1386 runs at 39.60, including six centuries.

After succeeding Roy Marshall as County Captain of Hampshire (1971–1978), he led the 1st XI to the 1973 County Championship. He also served as Assistant Secretary under Desmond Eagar.

After his cricket career he returned to Charterhouse as a teacher and housemaster. Following his effective stewardship as housemaster, he was appointed Second Master in 1996 and held this position until his retirement in summer 2004. His uncle, Ivor Gilliat, also played first-class cricket.

External links
 Richard Gilliat at Cricinfo

1944 births
Living people
English cricketers
Hampshire cricket captains
Hampshire cricketers
Oxford University cricketers
People educated at Charterhouse School
Alumni of Christ Church, Oxford
Marylebone Cricket Club cricketers
D. H. Robins' XI cricketers
Marylebone Cricket Club President's XI cricketers